Sir Patrick O'Brien, 2nd Baronet (1823 – 26 April 1895) was an Irish politician.

He was elected in 1852 as a member of parliament for King's County (now County Offaly), and held the seat until the constituency was divided at the 1885 general election. He was buried at Kensal Green Cemetery

References

External links 
 

1823 births
1895 deaths
Baronets in the Baronetage of the United Kingdom
Members of the Parliament of the United Kingdom for King's County constituencies (1801–1922)
Burials at Kensal Green Cemetery
Politicians from County Offaly
UK MPs 1852–1857
UK MPs 1857–1859
UK MPs 1859–1865
UK MPs 1865–1868
UK MPs 1868–1874
UK MPs 1874–1880
UK MPs 1880–1885